Krisis may refer to:

Krisis (German magazine)
Krisis (Dutch journal)
Krisis, a work of Mediaeval Dutch humanist Justus Velsius
 Krisis, a 1953 film by Usmar Ismail
Krisis (rhetoric), final judgement, a concept of classical rhetoric